2'-Deamino-2'-hydroxyneamine transaminase (kacL (gene)) is an enzyme with systematic name 2'-deamino-2'-hydroxyneamine:2-oxoglutarate aminotransferase. This enzyme catalyses the following chemical reaction

 2'-deamino-2'-hydroxyneamine + 2-oxoglutarate  2'-deamino-2'-hydroxy-6'-dehydroparomamine + L-glutamate

The reaction occurs in vivo in the opposite direction.

References

External links 
 

EC 2.6.1